Lazurka is a rural locality (a selo) in Zmeinogorsky District, Altai Krai, Russia. The population was 169 as of 2016. There are 9 streets.

Geography 
Lazurka is located on the right bank of the Bolshaya Goltsovka River, 28 km southeast of Zmeinogorsk (the district's administrative centre) by road. Galtsovka is the nearest rural locality.

Ethnicity 
The village is inhabited by Russians and others.

References 

Rural localities in Zmeinogorsky District